Plato Center is an unincorporated community in Kane County, Illinois, United States, located south of Pingree Grove. Plato Center has its own ZIP code, 60170, and is also part of ZIP code 60124.

References

Unincorporated communities in Illinois
Unincorporated communities in Kane County, Illinois